Boss of Hangtown Mesa is a 1942 American Western film directed by Joseph H. Lewis and written by Oliver Drake. The film stars Johnny Mack Brown, Fuzzy Knight, William Farnum, Rex Lease, Helen Deverell and Hugh Prosser. The film was released on August 21, 1942, by Universal Pictures.

Plot

Cast        
Johnny Mack Brown as Steve Collins
Fuzzy Knight as Dr. J. Wellington Dingle
William Farnum as Judge Ezra Binns
Rex Lease as Bert Lawler
Helen Deverell as Betty Wilkins
Hugh Prosser as Utah Kid
Robert Barron as Flash Hollister
Michael Vallon as Clint Rayner
Henry Hall as John Wilkins
Fred Kohler Jr. as Clem
Nora Lou Martin as Work Camp Singer

References

External links
 

1942 films
1940s English-language films
American Western (genre) films
1942 Western (genre) films
Universal Pictures films
Films directed by Joseph H. Lewis
American black-and-white films
1940s American films